GTN Arts & Science College is an arts college located in Dindigul, Tamil Nadu, India.

History
G.T.N. Arts College is the first creation of the Trust. The foundation stone of the College was laid on 20 January 1964 by the veteran statesman and ardent educationist, the Honorable Sri. M. Bakthavatsalam, the then Chief Minister of Government of Madras.

The College was formally inaugurated on 2 July 1964. In the first year of inception, the college was affiliated to the University of Madras offering instruction in Pre-University only.

In April 1965, after the formation of the Madurai University (now Madurai Kamaraj University) this college was affiliated to the Madurai University.

Location
The college is situated on Karur Road. The RVS School of Engineering and Technology is located nearby. It is an autonomous college under Kamaraj University, Madurai. The college is run by a trust of Soundaraja Mills P Ltd., Dindigul.

See also
Education in India
Literacy in India
List of institutions of higher education in Tamil Nadu

References

External links

Arts colleges in India
Education in Dindigul district
Dindigul
Educational institutions established in 1964
1964 establishments in Madras State
Colleges affiliated to Madurai Kamaraj University